Bolshoy Cheremshan (literally Greater Cheremshan, Olı Çirmeşän) is a river in Russia, a left tributary of the Volga between the Kama and Samara. It flows southwest to the Volga near Dimitrovgrad. The main inflows are the Bolshaya Sulcha and Maly Cheremshan. The riverbed is meandering and the meadows are wide. From around 1650 the Trans-Kama Line of forts ran along or near the Cheremshan.

References

 

Rivers of Tatarstan
Rivers of Samara Oblast
Rivers of Ulyanovsk Oblast